Corus fasciculosus is a species of beetle in the family Cerambycidae. It was described by Per Olof Christopher Aurivillius in 1903. It is known from Cameroon and the Democratic Republic of the Congo.

References

fasciculosus
Beetles described in 1903